Ivo Tiago dos Santos Rodrigues (born 30 March 1995) is a Portuguese professional footballer who plays for F.C. Famalicão mainly as a left winger.

Formed at Porto where he made a single Taça da Liga appearance, he played in the Primeira Liga for Vitória de Guimarães, Arouca, Paços de Ferreira and Famalicão. He also represented Antwerp, winning the Belgian Cup in 2020.

Club career

Porto
Born in the village of Baguim do Monte in Gondomar, Rodrigues joined FC Porto in 2005 at the age of 10. He played the remainder of his formative years with the club, also being loaned to Padroense F.C. who acted as the under-16 squad.

Rodrigues made his professional debut with the reserves on 12 August 2013, coming on as a 60th-minute substitute for Mauro Caballero in a 3–2 away win against S.C. Beira-Mar in the Segunda Liga championship. At the beginning of the 2014–15 season, he won the confidence of coach Luís Castro and became a starter, scoring a hat-trick in a 7–0 home rout of S.C. Olhanense.

In January 2015, after netting 11 times for the B side, Rodrigues was called up by first-team manager Julen Lopetegui for a Taça da Liga match against C.F. União to be held on the 14th. He played the first half of an eventual 3–1 home victory, before leaving the pitch with an injury.

On 2 February 2015, Rodrigues was loaned to Vitória de Guimarães, playing his first competitive game against C.F. Belenenses in the League Cup and making his first appearance in the Primeira Liga against the same opponent, in two matches separated by four days. For the 2015–16 campaign he went on loan at another top-flight side, F.C. Arouca, making his debut on 16 August 2015 by featuring the full 90 minutes in a 2–0 defeat of Moreirense FC.

Rodrigues spent the next year at F.C. Paços de Ferreira of the same league, and on the same basis.

Antwerp
Rodrigues moved abroad for the same time on 29 June 2017 to Royal Antwerp F.C. of the Belgian First Division A, as the first player to transfer in a partnership between the two clubs. He scored three times in his loan season, including two on 27 August in his second match for a 4–3 win at K.V. Oostende, and in May 2018 he ended his 13-year association with Porto by signing a three-year deal with Belgium's oldest club.

On 8 August 2019, on his debut in UEFA competitions, Rodrigues scored the only goal as his team beat FC Viktoria Plzeň at home in the first leg of the Europa League third qualifying round. Nearly a year later, he won the national cup, coming on in the last moments of a 1–0 final victory over Club Brugge KV.

Famalicão
Rodrigues returned to Portugal on 15 January 2021, joining F.C. Famalicão on a three-and-a-half-year contract. He opened his account on 21 March with two goals in a 4–0 win at C.S. Marítimo.

On 1 October 2021, after a 2–1 home loss to neighbours Vitória de Guimarães, Rodrigues pushed the fourth official and swore in English at the French referee. He was sent off, suspended for two games and fined €1,122.

International career
Rodrigues represented Portugal at the 2015 FIFA U-20 World Cup, playing all five games (only one complete) in an eventual quarter-final exit in New Zealand and scoring in a 4–0 group stage win over Qatar.

Career statistics

Club

Honours
Royal Antwerp
Belgian Cup: 2019–20

References

External links

 

1995 births
Living people
People from Gondomar, Portugal
Sportspeople from Porto District
Portuguese footballers
Association football wingers
Primeira Liga players
Liga Portugal 2 players
Padroense F.C. players
FC Porto B players
FC Porto players
Vitória S.C. players
F.C. Arouca players
F.C. Paços de Ferreira players
F.C. Famalicão players
Belgian Pro League players
Royal Antwerp F.C. players
Portugal youth international footballers
Portuguese expatriate footballers
Expatriate footballers in Belgium
Portuguese expatriate sportspeople in Belgium